Hossein Badamaki (born 13 September 1981) is a retired  Iranian Footballer who plays for Aboumoslem and Persepolis among other clubs in Persian Gulf Pro League.

Club career 
He was influential in the IPL 2005/06 season, scoring 10 goals for Aboomoslem. After playing for Aboomoslem for six years, in August 2006 he joined Iranian giants Persepolis.

The 2006/07 was his first season at Persepolis and despite the team not winning any trophies, Badamaki was one of the top players and every time Persepolis' triangle formed by him and teammates Mehrzad Madanchi and Alireza Vahedi Nikbakht played together Persepolis played really well and created a lot of chances.

During the 2007/08 season Badamaki was still one of the starters but his problems with head coach Afshin Ghotbi made him miss some matches but at the end of the season he was put back in the starting line-up and helped Persepolis win the league after 6 years.

The 2008/09 season was indisputably Badamaki's worst season in his career. An injury made him miss over 8 games and when he returned head coach Afshin Ghotbi did not think Badamaki was fit to play. When Ghotbi resigned and Peyrovani took over, Badamaki was put in the starting eleven but he did not play as well and during matches fans started to boo him showing that Ghotbi was right and even when Nelo Vingada became the head coach, Badamaki was put in the reserves but he finally played in the AFC Champions League due to Persepolis missing players to injuries and disciplinary problems.

Club career statistics
Last Update:  17 February 2018

 Assist Goals

International career 
In July 2006, he was one of the 40 players called up to the Iranian national team's preliminary squad for the 2007 Asian Cup.

On November 15, 2006, he made his debut for Iran against South Korea and scored in his debut. Badamaki was among Iran's squad winning the West Asian Football Federation Championship 2007.

He also was invited in June 2011 by Carlos Queiroz.

International goals 
Scores and results list Iran's goal tally first.

Honours

Club
Aboomoslem
Hazfi Cup:
Runner-up (1): 2004–05

Persepolis
Iran Pro League (1): 2007–08
Hazfi Cup (2): 2009–10, 2010–11
Runner-up (1): 2006 Hazfi Cup Final

Footnotes

See also 
List of Khorasani footballers

References

External links 

 Hossein Badamaki  at PersianLeague.com
 Hossein Badamaki's Profile in 18ghadam.ir
 
 

1981 births
F.C. Aboomoslem players
Iran international footballers
Iranian footballers
Living people
Sportspeople from Mashhad
Persian Gulf Pro League players
Azadegan League players
Persepolis F.C. players
Malavan players
Shahr Khodro F.C. players
Saba players
Association football midfielders